Wayne Bond (born ) is a professional rugby league footballer for the Redcliffe Dolphins in the Queensland Cup. He is a Papua New Guinea international.

He was named in the Papua New Guinea training squad for the 2008 Rugby League World Cup but did not make the final side due to injury.

References

External links
Redcliffe Dolphins profile

1986 births
Living people
Redcliffe Dolphins players
Papua New Guinean rugby league players